The canton of Épernay-1 is an administrative division of the Marne department, northeastern France. Its borders were modified at the French canton reorganisation which came into effect in March 2015. Its seat is in Épernay.

It consists of the following communes:
 
Ambonnay
Avenay-Val-d'Or
Aÿ-Champagne
Bouzy
Champillon
Cumières
Dizy
Épernay (partly)
Fontaine-sur-Ay
Germaine
Hautvillers
Magenta
Mardeuil
Mutigny
Nanteuil-la-Forêt
Saint-Imoges
Tours-sur-Marne
Val-de-Livre

References

Cantons of Marne (department)